The Stemweder Berg (also known as the Stemmer Berge) is a ridge  above sea level on the border of North Rhine-Westphalia and  Lower Saxony in Germany. It is the northernmost and smallest of Germany's Central Uplands ranges.

Like the adjacent municipality of Stemwede, the ridge gets its name from the medieval Free County (Freigrafschaft) of  Stemwede.

Location 
The Stemweder Berg lies on the southern rim of the North German Plain.

Relief 

Amongst the elevations on the Stemweder Berg are the following − sorted by height in metres above Normalnull (NN):
  Abbreviations: Lower Saxony = LS, North Rhine-Westphalia = NRW 

 Kollwesshöh (181.4 m), NRW
 Scharfer Berg (180.1 m), NRW
 Schlichter Brink (ca. 170 m), NRW
 Rauher Berg (167.8 m), NRW
 Wegmannsberg (160.5 m), NRW
 Kahler Hügel (146.4 m), NRW
 Junger Berg (ca. 145 m), NRW
 Dorenberg (140.3 m), NRW
 Feldbrink (128.1 m), LS
 Ostenberg (127.4 m), NRW
 Lemförder Berg (124.0 m), LS
 Brockumer Klei (116.5 m), LS
 Wehdemer Klei (98.1 m), NRW
The Dielinger Klei (91.7 m, NRW) may also be included as it is a dominant hill in the Stemwede area.

Streams 
Amongst the streams near the Stemweder Berg are the:
 Großer Dieckfluss, a western tributary of the Große Aue, which passes the ridge to the south
 Hunte, a southwestern tributary of the Weser, which passes the ridge some way to the west

References

External links 
 Diepholz Photo Gallery: Stemweder Berg
History and stories of the Stemweder Berg and Dümmer See 

Hill ranges of Germany
Forests and woodlands of North Rhine-Westphalia
Stemwede